openPlaG is a PHP based function graph plotter for use on websites. It was first released in April 2006. In June 2007 its source code was published under the GNU GPL license. PlaG is an abbreviation for Plot a Graph.

The current version 3.2 of openPlaG allows the display of up to three function graphs, their derivative and their integral. It can compute several different functions, with a focus on a large function variety and on probability functions. Settings for a graph can be saved and loaded. A substitution for a user-defined formula can be used. It has an instruction page, which explains the use of the plotter and the function syntax.

About 180 functions are predefined. These belong to the categories basic functions, trigonometric and hyperbolic functions, non-differentiable functions, probability functions, special functions, programmable functions, iterations and fractals, differential and integral equations.

See also
List of information graphics software

References

External links
 openPlaG in FSF/UNESCO Free Software Directory
 freshmeat listing
 openPlaG download page
 

Free plotting software
Plotting software
Fractal software